Kareem Abeed is a Syrian film producer best known for his 2017 documentary Last Men in Aleppo for which he was co-nominated for Academy Award for Best Documentary Feature.

Abeed and his team, was not able to attend the 90th Academy Awards ceremony, as his visa was rejected in response to President Trump's Executive Order 13780.

Filmography
 2017: Last Men in Aleppo (documentary feature)  
 2017: One Day in Aleppo (documentary short)

Awards and nominations 
 Asia Pacific Screen Award for Best Documentary Feature Film - Won 
 Academy Award for Best Documentary Feature - Nomination

References

External links
 

Living people
Syrian film producers
1984 births